Gustav or Gustaf Holm may refer to:

Gustaf Birger Anders Holm (1845–1910), Swedish lawyer and publisher
Gustav Engelbert Holm (1883–1957), Swedish farm worker and member of parliament
Gustav Frederik Holm (1849–1940), Danish naval officer and Arctic explorer
Robert Weil (writer) (1881–1950), Austrian writer for stage and screen who used "Gustav Holm" as a pseudonym
Gustav Holm (footballer)

See also
Gustav (name)
Holm (surname)
Gösta (disambiguation)
Gösta Holmér (1891–1983), Swedish decathlete